Martin Vossiek is an engineer at the University of Erlangen-Nuremberg, Germany. He was named a Fellow of the Institute of Electrical and Electronics Engineers (IEEE) in 2016 for his contributions to the design of wireless and radar positioning systems.

References 

Fellow Members of the IEEE
Living people
Engineers from Nuremberg
Year of birth missing (living people)
Academic staff of the University of Erlangen-Nuremberg